"Les Nuits sans soleil" is the debut single by French band Ivanov. They released it in 1989.

The song debuted at number 47 in France during the week of 9 September 1989, climbing all the way to number seven, where it spent two non-consecutive weeks in November and December.

Track listing

Charts

References

External links 
 

1989 songs
1989 debut singles
Pathé-Marconi singles